Justice? was a 1990s direct action group, based in Brighton, England. It campaigned against the Criminal Justice and Public Order Act 1994 and set up SchNEWS.

Courthouse
In 1994, the Justice? organisation held a number of meetings and debates in their squatted building (a former courthouse). Justice? was a deliberately loosely co-ordinated organisation formed around a community of people with differing and sometimes substantially conflicting political positions. Some of its more overt political actions were authored by the groups' collective persona Jo Makepeace. It campaigned against a bill in the British Parliament which was later to become the Criminal Justice and Public Order Act 1994.

Squatters Estate Agency
Justice? received mainstream media attention in 1996 (including coverage on the BBC Newsnight program) when they launched their "Squatters Estate Agency."

The group also organised two direct action conferences and ran a community allotment in Moulsecoomb.

SchNEWS
SchNEWS, the newsletter of the organisation, was founded at the Courthouse and read out at places in Brighton including the New Kensington pub. It continued until September 2014.

See also
 DIY culture
 DIY ethic
 Punk ideologies
 Reclaim the Streets
 M11 link road protest

References 

Brighton and Hove
DIY culture